This is a list of the candidates who ran for the Alberta Liberal Party in the 28th Alberta provincial election. The party ran a full slate of 87, winning 5.

Calgary area (28 seats)

Edmonton area (26 seats)

Remainder of province (33 seats)

See also
Alberta Liberal Party candidates, 2008 Alberta provincial election
Alberta Electoral Boundary Re-distribution, 2010

References

2012
Liberal Party candidates, 2012 Alberta provincial election, Alberta